Absynthe Magazine is a student magazine at Trent University. Absynthe's articles are written and submitted by any members of the Trent community. It was established in 1999 by Ken Giffen, Brad Harkness and Peter Read. Matt Griem maintained the paper through its second edition. In 2003, the organization formalized and created an executive board and a publication team. The executive board consists of the president, editor, secretary, treasurer, and member representatives, while the publication team is made up of the editor, soliciting editor, production manager and production assistant. It was in 2005 that the current editorial policy was written by Ted Cragg and Liz Zylstra and approved at the Annual General Meeting. Absynthe Magazine receives funding via a $4.00 (refundable) levy from each full-time student. ($2.00 from each nursing/part-time student).

In the fall of 2006, Absynthe came under fire after a contributor published an article linking obesity to laziness.  There was significant controversy in the Trent community over the article. Editor-in-Chief Matt McGowan supported the decision of the Soliciting Editor, Rheanna Leckie, to run the piece, noting that the magazine accepts submissions from all students and, only in rare circumstances, censors or turns away contributions. He also offered a guarantee that critical responses to either the piece or the Absynthe's decision to run it, would be published in subsequent editions, which was fulfilled.

In its ninth volume, 2007-2008, Editor-in-Chief Jeffrey Charters and President Joe Wood authorized a fundamental format change. The looseleaf newsprint format, used since Absynthe's founding was changed to a bound, full-colour, cover magazine format.

Since 2021, Absynthe Magazine has moved to both an online publication format along with free distribution of its physical magazine copies around the downtown Peterborough area and on the Trent University campus itself.

The Absynthe Team

The 2021-2022 Team 

 Remi Akers (Director)
 Shaun Phuah (Lead Editor)
 Kavya Chandra (Lead Editor)
 Madeleine Fortin (Editor)
 Shamara Peart (Editor)
 Nicole Corcuera (Editor)
 Sahira Jiddawy (Graphic Designer)

The 2020-2021 Team 
 Tyler Holt (Director)
 Zachary Barmania (Editor-in-Chief)
 Said Jiddawy (Graphic Designer)
 Emma Johns (Illustrator)
 Shaun Phuah (Staff Writer)
 Kelsey Guindon (Staff Writer)
 Kavya Chandra (Staff Writer)
 Julie Musclow (Staff Writer)
 Spencer Wells (Staff Writer)
 Melchior Dudley (Staff Writer)
 Remi Akers (Staff Writer)
 Jamie-Boyd Robinson (Staff Writer)
 Paige Emms (Staff Writer)
 Brayden Knox (Staff Writer)
 Reka Sazbo (Staff Writer)
 Zack Weaver (Staff Writer)

The 2019-2020 Team 
 Tyler Holt (Director)
 Evan Nelson (Editor-in-Chief)
 Said Jiddawy (Graphic Designer)
 Zachary Barmania (Staff Writer)
 Melchior Dudley (Staff Writer)
 Tyler Majer (Staff Writer)
 Warren Oliver (Staff Writer)
 Keira Purdon (Staff Writer)
 Mirza Ushra (Staff Writer)

The 2018-2019 Team 
 Tyler Holt (Director)
 Evan Nelson (Editor-in-Chief)
 Said Jiddawy (Graphic Designer)
 Chloe Darling (Illustrator)
 Zachary Barmania (Staff Writer)
 Melchior Dudley (Staff Writer)
 Tyler Majer (Staff Writer)
 Warren Oliver (Staff Writer)
 Keira Purdon (Staff Writer)
 Mirza Ushra (Staff Writer)
 Dylan Curran (Staff Writer)

The 2016-2017 Team
 Tyler Holt  (Director)
 Erin McLaughlin (Editor-in-Chief) 
 Sharniya Vigneswaralingam (Production Manager)
 Claire Valant (Graphic Artist)  
 Daniel Collins (Staff Writer)
 Josh White (Staff Writer)
 Joy Doonan (Staff Writer)
 Kaitlin Meaney (Staff Writer)
 Kelsey Stuart (Staff Writer)
 Mark Ellis (Staff Writer)
 Molly Dowrick (Staff Writer)

The 2015-2016 Team
 Jack Smye  (President)
 Zafer Izer (Editor-in-Chief) 
 Sharniya Vigneswaralingam (Production Manager)
 Christian Wigglesworth (Secretary)  
 Tyler Holt (Copy Editor)
 Alison Whitwam (Staff Writer)
 Erin McLaughlin (Staff Writer)
 Joy Doonan (Staff Writer)
 Mike Kosciesza (Staff Writer)

The 2014-2015 Team
 Bakhtawar Riaz  (President)
 Cait P. Jones (Editor-in-Chief) 
 Sobia Riaz  (Secretary)  
 Emma Labelle (Copy Editor)
 Candace Ellison (Staff Writer)
 Amanda Ferreira (Staff Writer)
 Zafer Izer (Staff Writer)
 Jack Smye (Staff Writer)

The 2013-2014 Team
 Vanessa Lupton (Editor-in-Chief) 
 Bakhtawar Riaz  (President)
 Cait P. Jones (Production Manager) 
 Emma Labelle (Production Assistant) 
 Ryan Knowles (Copy Editor)
 Lucas Abrahams (Advertising Manager)
 Hannah Ellsworth (Staff Writer)
 Jenna Goldsmith (Staff Writer)
 Zafer Izer (Staff Writer)

The 2012-2013 Team
 Cait P.  Jones  (Editor-in-Chief) 
 Joel Vaughan  (President)
 Virginia Chamunorwa  (Secretary)  
 Vanessa Lupton (Production Manager) 
 Christian Metaxas (Production Assistant) 
 Sarah Stunden (Copy Editor)
 Daniel Collins (Staff Writer)
 Evelyn DeShane (Staff Writer)
 Jennifer Freele (Staff Writer)

The 2011-2012 Team
 Cait P. Jones (Editor-in-Chief) 
 Joel Vaughan (President)
 Virginia Chamunorwa  (Secretary) 
 Vanessa Lupton (Production Manager) 
 Sarah Stunden (Copy Editor)
 Bukky Adejobi (Advertising Manager)
 Jennifer Freele (Events Reporter)
 Evelyn DeShane (Staff Writer)
 Nora Grant (Staff Writer)
 Juliana Johnson (Staff Writer)
 Christian Metaxas (Staff Writer)

The 2010-2011 Team
 Cait P. Jones (Editor-in-Chief) 
 John Gregg (President)
 Carly Robillard (Secretary) 
 Luli Maccagno (Production Manager) 
 Erik Moloney (Soliciting Editor)
 Jack Braithwaite (Member Representative)
 Mairi McGuire (Member Representative)
 Michelle Mackey (Member Representative)
 Joel Vaughan (Member Representative)
 Ryan Knowles (Member Representative)

The 2009-2010 Team
 Sara Hart (Editor-in-Chief) 
 Cait P. Jones (President)
 Laura Sullivan (Secretary) 
 Leo Kadzombe (Treasurer) 
 Kelsey Hough (Production Manager) 
 Sheldon Goodridge (Production Assistant) 
 Anthony Lozano (Soliciting Editor)
 Leanne Stewart (Distribution Manager)
 Emily Edwards (Member Representative)
 Cayla Price (Member Representative)
 Sarah Stunden (Member Representative)
 Sarah Schroer (Member Representative)
 John Gregg (Member Representative)
 Eric Chaplin (Member Representative)

The 2008-2009 Team
 Mary Kate Whibbs (Editor-in-Chief) 
 Joseph Wood (President)
 Yasmin Kehret (Secretary) 
 Scott Willis (Treasurer) 
 Sara Hart (Production Manager) 
 Kelsey Hough (Production Assistant) 
 Anthony Lozano (Soliciting Editor)
 Chris Davies (Member Representative)
 Amanda Saville (Member Representative)
 Braun Noppe (Member Representative)
 Heather Marshall (Member Representative)
 Cait P. Jones (Member Representative)
 S.J. DeLeskie (Member Representative)

The 2007-2008 Team
Jeffrey Charters (Editor in Chief) 
Joseph Wood (President)
Dana Skalin (Secretary) 
Adam Malcolm (Treasurer) 
Sheena Christie (Production Manager) 
Sara Hart (Production Assistant) 
Mary Kate Whibbs (Soliciting Editor) 
Jessica Monteith (Member Representative)
Sheena Smith (Member Representative)
Chris Augstman (Member Representative)

The 2006-2007 Team
Matt McGowan (Editor in Chief) 
Cynthia Warn (President)
Yasmin Kenret (Secretary) 
Joseph Wood (Treasurer) 
Sheena Christie (Production Manager) 
Crystal Robertson (Production Assistant and Webmistress) 
Rheanna Leckie (Soliciting Editor) 
Sasha Gilchrist (Member Representative)
Tyler Evans (Member Representative)
Alicia Niewiatowska (Member Representative)

The 2005-2006 Team
Andrew Barton (Editor in Chief) 
Lindsay Taylor (President)
Colleen Barfoot (Secretary) 
Kristen Rading (Treasurer) 
Matt McGowan (Production Manager) 
Cynthia Warn (Production Assistant) 
John Mullin/Lyndsey Darling (Soliciting Editor/Copy Editor) 
Laurel Karlsen, Laura Perry, Crystal Robertson (Member Representatives)

The 2004-2005 Team
Stephen Lanni and Rheanna Leckie (Co-presidents)
Lindsay Taylor (Treasurer)
Liz Zylstra (Secretary)
Ted Cragg, Colleen Barfoot and Cynthia (Member Representatives)
Andrew Barton (Editor in Chief) 
Steve Hobbs (Production Manager)
Matt McGowan (Production Assistant) 
John Mullin (Soliciting Editor.)

Original Staff 1999-2000
 Brad Harkness (editor in chief)	 
 Peter Read (production manager/layout)
 Ken Giffen (managing editor/sales)
 Kevin Sorichetti (contributor - illustrator)
 Reg Sims (contributor - sports)
 Kirk Lilwall (contributor - misc)
 Linda Watson (contributor - misc)
 Matt Keyes (contributor - music)
 Peter Venetas (contributor - music)
 Kelly Elliot (contributor - column) 
 Bronwen Appleton (contributor - column)
 Gavin Finders (contributor)
 Stephen Gouzopoulos (contributor)
 Dave Powrie (contributor)

See also
List of student newspapers in Canada
List of newspapers in Canada

References

http://trentcentral.ca/clubs-levy.php

Student magazines published in Canada
Magazines established in 1999
Trent University
Magazines published in Ontario
Mass media in Peterborough, Ontario
1999 establishments in Ontario